Sheri is a female given name, from the French for beloved, and may refer to:

 Sheri Anderson, American TV writer
 Sheri Everts, American academic 
 Sheri Forde, Canadian reporter
 Sheri Graner Ray, video game specialist
 Sheri L. Dew (born c. 1954), Latter-day Saint leader
 Sheri Moon (born 1970), American actress
 Sheri Reynolds, author
 Sheri S. Tepper (born 1929), American author
 Sheri Sam (born 1974), American professional basketball player

Sheri is also a term appearing in older documents for Sharia law. It, along with the French variant Chéri, was used during the time of the Ottoman Empire, and is from the Turkish şer’(i).

See also
Alternative spellings include

 Chari (disambiguation)
 Cheri (disambiguation)
 Cherie
 Cherri (disambiguation)
 Cherrie
 Cherry (disambiguation)
 Shari (disambiguation)
 Sherie
 Sherri (disambiguation)
 Sherrie
 Sherry (disambiguation)
 Shery

References